Shakuntala Devi is a 2020 Indian Hindi-language biographical drama film tracing the life of mathematician Shakuntala Devi, who was also known as the "human computer". It is written and directed by Anu Menon and produced by Sony Pictures Networks India, Abundantia Entertainment and Genius Films. The film stars Vidya Balan in a titular role as Shakuntala Devi, along with Sanya Malhotra, Amit Sadh and Jisshu Sengupta in supporting roles while child artist Spandan Chaturvedi in her film debut gives a cameo appearance as young Shakuntala.

Principal photography took place from September 2019 to November 2019. Originally planned for cinema release in May 2020, it was delayed owing to COVID-19 pandemic in India. Later, the film was directly streamed on Amazon Prime Video online on 31 July 2020 coinciding with Eid-al-Adha. Vidya Balan was also nominated for the 2021 Filmfare Award for Best Actress.

Plot 
In 2001, Anupama Banerjee arrives in London with her husband Ajay, and reveals that she is suing her mother, Shakuntala Devi.

The film shifts to Shakuntala Devi's childhood in Bengaluru in the 1930s, where her family discovers her incredible talent for quickly solving complex mathematical problems in her head. Her father, Bishaw, decides to use Shakuntala's talent and have her do "math shows," where she would entertain people with her problem solving prowess. Shakuntala continues to do math shows and earn for the family as she grows up, but blames her father for not letting her live a normal childhood. She also blames her mother for not standing up to him, especially in the wake of her sister's death. In 1954, she leaves for London after a violent altercation with her boyfriend, Dhiraj, after she learns that he had been pretending to love her even though he had a marriage fixed and even the invites printed out.

In London, Shakuntala lives with Tarabai in her home with three other Indian men, but struggles to find opportunities for her shows. But, she eventually manages to impress Javier, a Spanish mathematician when she shows off her skills at the Royal Mathematical Society in London. He helps improve Shakuntala's English and helps her get shows, and the pair begin a relationship as well. Shakuntala's popularity rapidly grows, and is given the nickname "The Human Computer" after she proves a computer wrong on a TV show. She expands her global influence by performing in other countries, and becomes a worldwide celebrity. Amidst all of this, Javier ends his relationship with Shakuntala, stating that he needs to return to Spain.

In 1968, Shakuntala meets Paritosh Banerji in Mumbai, and the two quickly fall in love. The couple eventually get married and settle in Kolkata, with the aspirations of starting a family. In 1970, Shakuntala gives birth to Anupama, nicknamed Anu, and devotes her life to being a mother. However, she realizes how much she misses doing shows and decides to resume her career, leaving Anu with Paritosh. Shakuntala continues to amaze people, and even makes it into The Guinness Book of Records, but she worries about being an uncaring mother. Ultimately, she decides to take Anu with her on her travels, much to Paritosh's dismay. They soon divorce.

While growing up, Anu travels around the world with her mother. As Shakuntala is constantly exploring new career avenues, Anu finds herself constantly ignored and disenchanted with her life. Even after enrolling Anu in a boarding school, Shakuntala uses every opportunity she can to have Anu accompany her. This reaches a breaking point when a teenage Anu lashes out at her mother for building her career at the expense of her childhood. In response, Shakuntala takes a break and settles with Anu in London, even supporting her business aspirations. This helps the two become close. Their relationship sours again when an adult Anu decides to marry Ajay Abhaya Kumar, a businessman. Shakuntala informs Ajay of her expectation of him moving with them to London, despite him being settled in Bengaluru. Anu accuses her mother of constantly holding her back and not letting her live her own life. Shakuntala, unwilling to let her daughter go, threatens to shut down Anu's business. Anu cuts off all contact with Shakuntala, and marries Ajay. She decides to not have children, fearing that she won't be a good mother. Despite this, Anu gives birth to a daughter, Amritha.

Anu and Ajay receive a shock when they are informed that Shakuntala used her power of attorney to sell Anu's business properties, while giving her zero percent of the profit share. Furthermore, she passed the payment of the capital gains tax on to Anu, leaving her family in massive debt. Anu and Ajay decide to take legal action against Shakuntala, and travel to London for the proceedings. Upon their arrival, they discover that Shakuntala's actions were a stunt, done so she could force her daughter to come see her. Shakuntala gives Anu the profit received from the sale of her properties, and asks for her forgiveness. Anu forgives her mother, and the two have an emotional reunion.

Cast 
Vidya Balan as Shakuntala Devi a.k.a. "Shaku": Paritosh's former wife, Anupama's mother and Amrita's grandmother
Spandan Chaturvedi as teenage Shakuntala
Araina Nand as child Shakuntala
Jisshu Sengupta as Paritosh Bannerji: Shakuntala's former husband, Anupama's father and Amrita's grandfather
Sanya Malhotra as Anupama Bannerji a.k.a. "Anu": Shakuntala and Paritosh's daughter; Ajay's wife and Amrita's mother.
 Chahat Tewani as Anu (teenage)
Amit Sadh as Ajay Abhaya Kumar: Anupama's husband and Amrita's father
 Prakash Belawadi as Bishaw Mitra Mani: Shakuntala's father
 Nisha Aaliya as Bookshop Interviewer,
 Sheeba Chaddha as Tarabai Banarsi, Shakuntala's landlady in London
 Vidyuth Gargi as Mohan Manhas, a TV game show host
 Ipshita Chakraborty Singh as Mrs. Devi, Shakuntala's mother
 Jiya Shah as Sharada Devi, Shaku's sister
 Renuka Sharma as Mrs. Kumar, Ajay's mother
 Neil Bhoopalam as Dheeraj Rajan, Shakuntala's former boyfriend
 Luca Calvani as Javier Lewis, Shakuntala's Spanish boyfriend based in London.

 Lan Bailey as Mediator
 Ahan Nirbhan as Srinivas 
 Adi Chugh as Kartar
 Philip Roy as Shakuntala's lawyer
 Jack Francis as Anupama's lawyer
 Santosh Banerjee as Gordhanbhai

Release 
Due to the COVID-19 pandemic, the film was not released theatrically and streamed on Amazon Prime Video worldwide on 31 July 2020. Vidya Balan expressed her delight on social media platforms regarding the release of the film on over-the-top media services.

Soundtrack 

 
The film's music was composed by Sachin–Jigar while lyrics written by Vayu and Priya Saraiya.

Critical reception
The film received positive reviews from critics. Sreeparna Sengupta of Times of India gave the film three and half stars out of five and said, "A joy to watch simply to soak in the fascinating life and times of the maths whiz – a human computer faster than an actual computer, the free-spirit, who was all that and so much more!" Shubhra Gupta of The Indian Express rated the movie 3/5, calling it "a Vidya Balan show". Saibal Chatterjee of NDTV opined "the numbers add up nicely with a feisty Vidya Balan", giving the movie 3/5. Mike McCahill of The Guardian gave it three stars out of five and said, "The movie finds funny ways of dramatising the process whereby one generation of women squares its frustrations with another – but it adds up to spirited, intelligent, authentically feminist entertainment."

References

External links 
 
 
 Shakuntala Devi on Amazon Prime

2020s Hindi-language films
2020 films
Indian biographical films
Amazon Prime Video original films
Sony Pictures films
Columbia Pictures films
Sony Pictures Networks India films
Films about women in India
2020s biographical films